Chick Carter, Detective is a 1946 Columbia film serial. Columbia could not afford the rights to produce a Nick Carter serial so they made Chick Carter, Detective about his son instead. This was based on the radio series Chick Carter, Boy Detective. A Nick Carter series was being made by MGM.

In a "rather strange precedent" for a serial, the title character is rarely involved in the cliffhangers.  For example, the first cliffhanger revolves around the reporter Rusty rather than Carter. The film starred Lyle Talbot as Chick Carter, Douglas Fowley as Rusty Farrell, Julie Gibson as Sherry Marvin, Pamela Blake as Ellen Dale, Eddie Acuff as Spud Warner, and Robert Elliott as Dan Rankin.

Plot
Detective Chick Carter (Lyle Talbot) finds himself in a complex case when Sherry Martin (Julie Gibson), a singer at the Century Club, reports the robbery of the famous Blue Diamond, owned by Joe Carney (Charles King), the owner of the nightclub. Joe planned the theft in order to pay a debt to Nick Pollo (George Meeker) with the $100,000 insurance money he would collect. Sherry double-crossed Joe by wearing an imitation one, while she threw the real one, hidden in a cotton snowball, to Nick during the floor show. But Spud Warner (Eddie Acuff), a newspaper photographer, there with newspaper reporter Rusty Farrell (Douglas Fowley), takes a snowball from her basket and Nick receives an empty one. The Blue Diamond disappears. Aided by a private investigator, Ellen Dale (Pamela Blake), Chick finds himself pitted against the criminals searching for the missing Blue Diamond...

Main cast
 Lyle Talbot as Chick Carter
 Douglas Fowley as Rusty Farrell
 Julie Gibson as Sherry Marvin
 Pamela Blake as Ellen Dale
 Eddie Acuff as Spud Warner
 Robert Elliot as Dan Rankin
 George Meeker as Nick Pollo
 Leonard Penn as Vasky
 Charles King as Joe Carney
 Jack Ingram as Mack
 Joel Friedkin as Jules Hoyt
 Eddie Parker as Frank Sharp

Chapter titles
 Chick Carter Takes Over
 Jump to Eternity
 Grinding Wheels
 Chick Carter Trapped
 Out of Control
 Chick Carter's Quest
 Chick Carter's Frame-up
 Chick Carter Gives Chase
 Shadows in the Night
 Run to Earth
 Hurled Into Space
 Chick Carter Faces Death
 Rendezvous with Murder
 Chick Carter Sets a Trap
 Chick Carter Wins Out
Source:

See also
 List of film serials by year
 List of film serials by studio

References

External links
 
 

1946 films
1940s English-language films
American black-and-white films
Columbia Pictures film serials
1940s crime films
Nick Carter (literary character)
American crime films
Films with screenplays by Harry L. Fraser
Films with screenplays by George H. Plympton
Films directed by Derwin Abrahams
1940s American films